The Electric Cinema is a cinema in Notting Hill, London. One of the oldest working film theatres in Britain, it became Britain's first black-owned cinema in 1993, and remained black-owned until it was sold in 2000.

, after a couple of changes of hands, the cinema is also known as the Electric Portobello, with a second screen at the old Television Centre at White City called the Electric White City.

History
The Electric Cinema first opened in London's Portobello Road on 24 February 1910. It was one of the first buildings in Britain to be designed specifically for motion picture exhibition, and was one of the first buildings in the vicinity to be supplied with electricity. It was built shortly after its namesake the Electric Cinema in Birmingham, which predates it by around two months. Its first film was Henry VIII, screened on 23 February 1911.

The venue opened 18 years before talkies became the norm, so had no facilities to broadcast sound. The cinema was soon eclipsed by the huge picture palaces that became fashionable during the 1930s but, despite being shuttered for brief periods, it has remained in almost continual use until the present day.

Designed by architect Gerald Seymour Valentin in the Edwardian Baroque style, it originally opened as the Electric Cinema Theatre, with 600 seats. During World War I an angry mob attacked the Electric, believing that its German-born manager was signalling to Zeppelin raiders from the roof, after nearby Arundel Gardens was hit by a bomb dropped from a Zeppelin.

Later, in 1932, the Electric became the Imperial Playhouse cinema, though by this time the Portobello Road area had become run down, along with the rest of Notting Hill. During this time, the venue's nickname among locals was "The Bughole".

During WWII the venue was attended by up to 4000 per week, despite the Luftwaffe's night-time bombing raids. During the late 1940s the notorious mass murderer John Christie (1899–1953) of nearby 10 Rillington Place is said to have worked at the Electric as a projectionist

In the late 1960s the venue changed its to the Electric Cinema Club, showing mostly independent and avant garde films. In 1984 the then-owners Mainline Pictures proposed to turn the venue into an antiques market; a petition against these plans reached over 10,000 signatures, including those of Audrey Hepburn and Anthony Hopkins.

Thereafter it opened and closed several times without finding commercial success. In 1992 it went into voluntary receivership and tried to find a buyer. In July 1993 Paul Bucknor assembled a consortium including Choice FM and The Voice that moved in, with the aim of promoting black film effectively making it the first black owned cinema in the UK. They were said to have paid almost £1 million to prepare the building for the Notting Hill Carnival in August 1993.

Modern era and revival

In the late 1990s the site was acquired by local property developer, European Estates and architects, Gebler Tooth. Four years of planning followed in which Gebler Tooth developed the plan that would re-establish the commercial viability of the theatre. The critical element was acquiring the shop next door which would provide space for upgraded WCs, air conditioning plant and a restaurant.

In 2000 the site was acquired by its current owner, the retail entrepreneur Peter Simon, who at the beginning of his career had traded from a market stall outside. Simon invested £5m in the restoration of the Edwardian façade and interior before leasing the site to Soho House.

It is a Grade II* Listed building.

On 9 June 2012, the building was evacuated due to a fire, and remained closed until it reopened on 3 December 2012.

See also
Notting Hill
Electric Cinema, Birmingham

Notes

External links
  Retrieved November 2010
 article on the Electric Cinema at cinematreasures.org Retrieved November 2010
 The Rediscovery of London's Electric Cinema, Sunday Times 04.03.01 Retrieved November 2010
 Electric Cinema at cinematour.org Retrieved November 2010
 review of the newly refurbished Electric Cinema Retrieved November 2010

Buildings and structures in Notting Hill
Cinemas in London
Grade II* listed buildings in the Royal Borough of Kensington and Chelsea
History of the Royal Borough of Kensington and Chelsea